Turning the Pages is software technology for viewing scanned books on-line in a realistic and detailed manner. It was developed by the British Library in partnership with Armadillo Systems.

The original version, first released in 1997, uses Adobe Shockwave.

In January 2007 version 2.0 version was developed for Microsoft Vista using a browser-based Windows Presentation Foundation format. Features include page turns that are modeled on the actually deformation of different types of material (for example in a book with vellum pages, which is heavier than printed on paper, will appear to collapse under its own weight as it is turned). For certain books, such as the Sherborne Missal, the gold leaf catches the light as the book moves around.

The British Library has released a "Turning the Pages Toolkit" for libraries around the world to put their collections online.

The Codex Leicester along with Codex Arundel was one of the first to be made available in the 2.0 format, with Bill Gates saying "This is an innovative way to bring treasures - including mine - to a new audience,"

External links
Official
Turning the Pages, official site.
Turning the Pages 2.0, video about TtP 2.0
Turning the Pages, from the British Library.

Multimedia software
British Library